Simola may refer to:

Simola (surname)
Simola in Rovaniemi, Finland
Raippo - Simola in Lappeenranta, Finland
 Simola Golf Course near Knysna, South Africa